John B Mather ( – 31 January 1892) was the son of Scottish immigrants and became a Canadian businessman and politician.

Mather was born in Islington, Canada West.

Mather's early introduction to business was as an employee of Frank Smith, a leading grocer in Toronto. He moved to Winnipeg, Manitoba in 1881 and established himself as a leading Winnipeg wholesaler. It was a time where the business emphasis in the West was switching from the Hudson's Bay Company and the St Paul, Minnesota merchants to products and businesses from eastern Canada. He quickly became successful in business and involved himself in the social and political life of his new home.

In 1887 he was president of the Granite Curling Club and in 1890 was elected as an alderman to Winnipeg City Council.

He was inducted into the Canadian Curling Hall of Fame in 1974.

External links 
 Biography at the Dictionary of Canadian Biography Online
 Manitoba Historical Society - John B Mather

References

Winnipeg city councillors
Year of birth uncertain
1892 deaths
Businesspeople from Toronto
Politicians from Toronto
Businesspeople from Winnipeg
People from Etobicoke
Canadian sportsperson-politicians
Canadian people of Scottish descent
1845 births